Celiptera cometephora is a moth of the family Erebidae. It is found on Jamaica.

References

Moths described in 1913
Celiptera